Francis Han Tingbi (February 22, 1908 - December 21, 1991) was a Chinese Catholic priest and Bishop of the Roman Catholic Diocese of Hongdong between 1950 and 1991.

Biography
Han came from a Catholic family who had moved from Shandong to Shanxi after and because of the Taiping Rebellion. He was ordained a priest on July 22, 1934.

On April 18, 1950, he was appointed Bishop of the Roman Catholic Diocese of Hongdong by Pope Pius XII. On July 9, his consecration ceremony was held. In 1958, during the rule of Mao Zedong, Hongdong was selected as one of the two pilot counties for the elimination of religion in China (the other is Pingyang, Zhejiang). The local Catholic Church was facing a catastrophe and the cathedral was demolished.

After being released in 1979, he resumed leadership in his diocese. He joined the Communist-sponsored Chinese diocesan conference when it was established in 1980, but he refused to establish a branch of the Chinese Patriotic Catholic Association in the diocese. In 1982, he secretly consecrated the priest Li Weidao to Bishop of the Roman Catholic Diocese of Lu'an, and father Augustine Zheng Shouduo to Bishop of the Roman Catholic Diocese of Xinjiang. On April 29, 1986, he gave a consecration to Peter Chen Bolu as Bishop of the Roman Catholic Diocese of Yongnian. On February 22, 1991, he consecrated 71-year-old Father Joseph Sun Yuanmou to his auxiliary bishop, also in secret. He died on December 21, 1991.

References

1908 births
1991 deaths
20th-century Roman Catholic bishops in China